Sto Kokkino (Greek: Στο Κόκκινο; English: In The Red) is the third studio album by Greek artist, Elli Kokkinou. It was released on 15 May 2003 by Heaven Music and certified gold in the summer, but after five months gained platinum certification, selling 40,000 units. The album was written by Phoebus, with remaining lyrics by Natalia Germanou and Vaggelis Konstantinidis.

Track listing

Singles 
The following singles were officially released to radio stations and made into music videos, except the song "Erota Mou", and gained a lot of airplay.

 "Masai"
 "De Ginetai" (It's Impossible)
 "Sorry"
 "Agori Mou" (My Boy)
 "Thelo Tosa Na Sou Po" (I Want To Tell You So Much)
 "Kosmotheoria" (Worldview)
 "Erota Mou" (My Love)
 "Afto To Kalokairi" (This Summer)

Credits 
Credits adapted from liner notes.

Personnel

 Dimos Beke – backing vocals (tracks: 3)
 Hakan Bingolou – oud, säz (tracks: 4)
 Giannis Bithikotsis – bouzouki (tracks: 2, 6, 8, 11, 12) / cura (tracks: 2, 5, 6, 8, 11) / baglama (tracks: 2, 6, 8, 11)
 Panagiotis Charamis – bass (tracks: 9)
 Giorgos Chatzopoulos – guitars (tracks: 1, 2, 3, 4, 5, 6, 8, 9, 10, 11, 12, 13)
 Akis Diximos – second vocal (tracks: 1, 2, 6, 8, 10, 11, 12)
 Rania Dizikiriki – backing vocals (tracks: 2, 6, 8, 9, 12, 13)
 Antonis Gounaris – orchestration, programming, keyboards (tracks: 2) / guitars (tracks: 2, 7)
 Trifon Koutsourelis – orchestration, programming, keyboards (tracks: 3, 4, 5, 6, 7, 8, 10, 11, 12, 13) / guitars (tracks: 7, 13)
 Alex Leon – orchestration, programming, keyboards (tracks: 9)
 Fedon Lionoudakis – accordion (tracks: 1, 2, 6, 8, 11, 12)
 Alex Panagi – backing vocals (tracks: 3, 4, 5, 9, 13)
 Phoebus – orchestration (tracks: 1, 4, 6, 7, 8, 9, 11, 12) / programming, keyboards, claps (tracks: 1) / backing vocals (tracks: 1, 3)
 Giorgos Roilos – percussion (tracks: 1, 3, 4, 5, 12)
 Vaggelis Siapatis – backing vocals, claps (tracks: 1)
 Giorgos Stabolis – backing vocals (tracks: 3) / claps (tracks: 1)
 Antigoni Tsiplakidou – backing vocals (tracks: 3, 4, 5)
 Thanasis Vasilopoulos – clarinet (tracks: 4)
 Martha Zioga – backing vocals (tracks: 2, 4, 5, 6, 8, 9, 12, 13)

Production 

 Al Giga – styling
 Giannis Ioannidis (Digital Press Hellas) – mastering
 Konstantinos Kagkas – hair styling
 Giorgos Klaromenos – imagine director
 Lefteris Neromiliotis – mix engineer
 Phoebus – executive producer
 Panos Pitsilidis – art direction
 Vaggelis Siapatis – computer editing, sound engineer
 Giorgos Stabolis – computer editing
 Katerina Tsatsani – photographer
 Alexis Valourdos – imagine director
 Manolis Vlachos – mix engineer

Charts 
Sto Kokkino made its debut at number 1 on the 'Top 50 Greek Albums' charts by IFPI.

After months, it was certified platinum according to sales.

Sto Kokkino: Platinum Edition 

Sto Kokkino: Platinum Edition is the re-release of third studio album Sto Kokkino by Greek artist, Elli Kokkinou. It was released on 27 October 2004 by Heaven Music and received double-platinum certification, selling other 40,000 units. Ιn one of the songs featuring Giorgos Tsalikis. It also includes a DVD with music videos, photos, and interviews.

Track listing

DVD 
DVD contains the video clips of following songs:
 "Kosmotheoria"
 "Sorry"
 "De Ginetai"
 "Afto To Kalokeri + MAD Version"
 "Erota Mou + Agori Mou" (medley)
 "To Gucci Ton Masai" (ft. Giorgos Mazonakis)
 "Thelo Tosa Na Sou Po" (ft. Nino)

Singles 
The following singles were officially released to radio stations and made into music videos, except the song "Gine", and gained a lot of airplay.

 "Gine" (Become)
 "Bye Bye"
 "Tha Perimeno" (I'll Wait)

Credits 
Credits adapted from liner notes.

Personnel

 Giannis Bithikotsis – bouzouki, cura, baglama (tracks: 2, 4)
 Victoria Chalkiti – backing vocals (tracks: 1, 2, 3)
 Akis Diximos – second vocal (tracks: 1, 2)
 Nektarios Georgiadis – backing vocals (tracks: 1)
 Antonis Gounaris – orchestration, programming, keyboards (tracks: 2) / guitars (tracks: 1, 2, 3, 4) / cura (tracks: 3)
 Trifon Koutsourelis – orchestration, programming, keyboards (tracks: 1, 2, 3, 4)
 Andreas Mouzakis – drums (tracks: 1, 3)
 Alex Panagi – backing vocals (tracks: 2, 3)
 Phoebus – orchestration (tracks: 1, 3)
 Giorgos Roilos – percussion (tracks: 2)
 Martha Zioga – backing vocals (tracks: 2, 3)

Production 

 Giannis Ioannidis (Digital Press Hellas) – mastering
 Konstantinos Kagkas – hair styling
 Vaggelis Kiris – photographer
 Vanesa Koutsopodiotou – make up
 Vaggelis Papadopoulos – sound engineer
 Panagiotis Petronikolos – mix engineer
 Phoebus – executive producer
 Panos Pitsilidis – art direction
 Thodoris Psiachos – photographer
 Vaggelis Siapatis – computer editing, sound engineer
 Katerina Tsatsani – photographer

Charts 
Sto Kokkino: Platinum Edition made its debut at number 3 on the 'Top 50 Greek Albums' charts by IFPI.

After months, it was certified double-platinum according to sales.

References 

2003 albums
2004 albums
Albums produced by Phoebus (songwriter)
Elli Kokkinou albums
Greek-language albums
Heaven Music albums